The Eagles Hall in San Diego, California is a Classical Revival building designed and built in 1917 and significantly modified in 1934 according to designs by the same architects. It was listed on the National Register of Historic Places in 1985.

It is a three-story monumental building.  The modified building has  on a  plan.

See also
List of Fraternal Order of Eagles buildings

References

Clubhouses on the National Register of Historic Places in California
National Register of Historic Places in San Diego
Buildings and structures in San Diego
Fraternal Order of Eagles buildings